Chokri Jouini (born ) is a Tunisian male volleyball player. With his club Esperance Sportive de Tunis he competed at the 2014 FIVB Volleyball Men's Club World Championship.

References

External links
 profile at FIVB.org

1989 births
Living people
Tunisian men's volleyball players
Place of birth missing (living people)
20th-century Tunisian people
21st-century Tunisian people